Abdullah Qaisi (born May 8, 1990) is a Saudi Arabian professional footballer who plays as a midfielder for Hetten.

Club career 
Abdullah Qaisi joined Al Wehda from Hetten on 13 January 2014. He made his debut on 17 January 2014 in the league match against Al-Riyadh. He scored his first goal for the club on 31 January 2014 in the 3–0 away win against former club Hetten. He ended up making 13 appearances and scored three goals in his first season at Al-Wehda. In his second season, he made 12 league appearances as Al-Wehda earned promotion to the Pro League.

On 12 July 2015, Qaisi joined Pro League side Hajer on loan until the end of the season. He made his debut on 28 August 2015 in the 2–1 home loss against Al-Shabab. He made 14 appearances and did not score before returning to Al-Wehda following the conclusion of the season. On 3 November 2016, Qaisi joined First Division side Al-Fayha on a 18 month contract. He made his debut on 5 November 2016 by coming off the bench in the 83rd minute against Al-Adalah. On 19 November 2016, Qaisi made his first start for Al-Fayha and scored twice in the 2–0 win against Al-Qaisumah. He scored six goals in 21 appearances as Al-Fayha finished as winners of the 2016–17 First Division.

Following Al-Fayha's promotion to the Pro League, Qaisi was released by the club. On 4 September 2017, he joined First Division club Al-Shoulla on a one-year contract. On 26 May 2018, Qaisi joined Al-Tai. On 1 January 2019, he was released by the club. On 6 January 2019, Qaisi signed for Abha. Abha won the 2018–19 MS League title and earned promotion to the Pro League for the first time since 2009.

Career statistics

Club

Honours

Al-Fayha
First Division: 2016–17

Abha
MS League: 2018–19

External links

References

1990 births
Living people
People from Jizan Province
Saudi Arabian footballers
Hetten FC players
Al-Wehda Club (Mecca) players
Hajer FC players
Al-Fayha FC players
Al-Shoulla FC players
Al-Tai FC players
Abha Club players
Damac FC players
Al-Riyadh SC players
Association football wingers
Saudi First Division League players
Saudi Professional League players
Saudi Second Division players